Hans-Georg Wieck (born March 28, 1928 in Hamburg) is a former German diplomat and was president of the German federal intelligence service Bundesnachrichtendienst (BND).

Life 
Wieck studied history and philosophy in Hamburg from 1947 to 1952 and received his PhD in 1953 with a dissertation named "The Origin of the Christian Democratic Union and the re-establishment of the Centre Party from 1945 to 1947."

From 1954 to 1993 he was an official at the Foreign Office for which he served as ambassador to Iran, the USSR and India. He was also permanent representative of the Federal Republic of Germany at the North Atlantic Council (NATO). He served at the Ministry of Defence inter alia as head of the Policy Planning Staff and became president of the BND from 1985 to 1990.

After his retirement from government service he was head of the OSCE Advisory and Monitoring Group in Minsk, Belarus from 1998 to 2001. From 1996 to September 2008 he was Chairman of the German - Indian Society.

Currently Wieck is advisor to the Gesprächskreis Nachrichtendienste in Deutschland e.V. (GKND), a discussion group about intelligence services in Germany founded by his former colleague Wolbert Klaus Smidt in close cooperation with him.

Hans-Georg Wieck is one of the critics of the regulation introduced by former German Foreign Minister Joschka Fischer that former diplomats who were NSDAP members were no longer honored after their death with an obituary in the bulletin of the Foreign Office.

References 

People of the Federal Intelligence Service
1928 births
Living people
Permanent Representatives of West Germany to NATO
Commanders Crosses of the Order of Merit of the Federal Republic of Germany
German expatriates in Iran
German expatriates in the Soviet Union
German expatriates in India
German expatriates in Belarus